Bad Behaviour is a 2010 Australian crime thriller film, written and directed and by Joseph Sims and starring John Jarratt, Lindsay Farris and Dwaine Stevenson and features in supporting roles Robert Coleby, Georgina Symes, Roger Ward, Jean Kittson and Ellen Grimshaw.

Plot
The film chronicles the intersecting storylines of a variety of characters using a Nonlinear narrative. Emma and Peterson are two sociopathic siblings who drift into the sleepy coastal town of Cecil Bay, on the run from the brutal gangster, Voyte Parker (Roger Ward). Over the course of the film, Senior Constable Richard 'Ricky' Bartlett (John Jarratt) is driven violently insane, his partner, Constable Mark Brown (Dwaine Stevenson) is confronted and consumed with his wife's infidelity. Final year high school students, Chaar, Matt, Candice, Danny and Sam just want to party.

Cast
 John Jarratt as Ricky
 Lindsay Farris as Peterson
 Caroline Levien as Emma
 Dwaine Stevenson as Mark
 Robert Coleby as Clive
 Georgina Symes as Jennifer
 Roger Ward as Voyte
 Jean Kittson as Jane
 Ellen Grimshaw as Chaar

Awards

References

External links
 
 
 Bad Behaviour character posters

2010 films
Australian crime thriller films
2010s English-language films
2010s Australian films